"Watch Your Step" is a song written and recorded in 1961 by rhythm and blues guitarist Bobby Parker. The song spent several weeks in the Billboard Hot 100 chart, peaking at number 51 during the week of July 15, 1961.

Original release
The song was written by Parker, inspired by Dizzy Gillespie's "Manteca" and Ray Charles' "What'd I Say".  Parker said "I started playing [Gillespie's] riff on my guitar and decided to make a blues out of it."  It was recorded at the Edgewood Recording Studio in Washington DC in 1961, with Thomas "TNT" Tribble on drums.  The record was released on the V-Tone record label, a small enterprise that had been started in Philadelphia, Pennsylvania by Venton "Buddy" Caldwell.

Influence 
The single was released in the UK, and had influence far beyond its modest commercial success. It was covered by various artists including Adam Faith, Manfred Mann, and the Spencer Davis Group.  In particular, its main riff served as the inspiration for several songs by the Beatles, most notably "I Feel Fine" and "Day Tripper". In The Beatles Anthology, John Lennon said: "'Watch Your Step' is one of my favourite records. The Beatles have used the lick in various forms. The Allman Brothers used the lick straight as it was." The Allman Brothers song he refers to is "One Way Out", originally written and recorded by Elmore James.

Led Zeppelin also used the riff as the basis for their instrumental, "Moby Dick".  Others, including the Yardbirds ("I’m Not Talking", 1965), Deep Purple ("Rat Bat Blue", 1973), Gamma Ray ("New World Order", 2001) and Mahjongg ("Tell the Police the Truth", 2008) were inspired by the riff.

References 

1961 songs
1961 singles